Borysthenia naticina is a species of small freshwater snail with a gill and an operculum, an aquatic gastropod mollusc in the family Valvatidae, the valve snails.

Distribution
This species occurs in the Pontic and Baltic regions as follows:

 Germany - critically endangered (vom Aussterben bedroht)
 Poland - critically endangered
 Slovakia

Habitat
This is a freshwater species.

References

Valvatidae
Gastropods described in 1845